Tiagabine (trade name Gabitril) is an anticonvulsant medication produced by Cephalon that is used in the treatment of epilepsy. The drug is also used off-label in the treatment of anxiety disorders and panic disorder.

Medical uses
Tiagabine is approved by U.S. Food and Drug Administration (FDA) as an adjunctive treatment for partial seizures in individuals of age 12 and up. It may also be prescribed off-label by physicians to treat anxiety disorders and panic disorder as well as neuropathic pain (including fibromyalgia). For anxiety and neuropathic pain, tiagabine is used primarily to augment other treatments. Tiagabine may be used alongside selective serotonin reuptake inhibitors, serotonin-norepinephrine reuptake inhibitors, or benzodiazepines for anxiety, or antidepressants, gabapentin, other anticonvulsants, or opioids for neuropathic pain. It is effective as monotherapy and combination therapy with other antiepileptic drugs in the treatment of partial seizure.

The American Academy of Sleep Medicine's 2017 clinical practice guidelines recommended against the use of tiagabine in the treatment of insomnia due to poor effectiveness and very low quality of evidence.

Side effects
Side effects of tiagabine are dose related. The most common side effect of tiagabine is dizziness. Other side effects that have been observed with a rate of statistical significance relative to placebo include asthenia, somnolence, nervousness, memory impairment, tremor, headache, diarrhea, and depression. Adverse effects such as confusion, aphasia (difficulty speaking clearly)/stuttering, and paresthesia (a tingling sensation in the body's extremities, particularly the hands and fingers) may occur at higher dosages of the drug (e.g., over 8 mg/day). Tiagabine may induce seizures in those without epilepsy, particularly if they are taking another drug which lowers the seizure threshold. There may be an increased risk of psychosis with tiagabine treatment, although data is mixed and inconclusive. Tiagabine can also reportedly interfere with visual color perception.

Warning 

 CNS depression
 Dermatologic reactions
 Generalized weakness
 Ophthalmic effects
 Suicidal ideation

Overdose
Tiagabine overdose can produce neurological symptoms such as lethargy, single or multiple seizures, status epilepticus, coma, confusion, agitation, tremors, dizziness, dystonias/abnormal posturing, and hallucinations, as well as respiratory depression, tachycardia, hypertension, and hypotension. Overdose may be fatal especially if the victim presents with severe respiratory depression and/or unresponsiveness.

Pharmacology
Tiagabine increases the level of γ-aminobutyric acid (GABA), the major inhibitory neurotransmitter in the central nervous system, by blocking the GABA transporter 1 (GAT-1), and hence is classified as a GABA reuptake inhibitor (GRI).

Pharmacodynamics 
Tiagabine is primarily used as an anticonvulsant in the treatment of epilepsy as a supplement. Although the exact mechanism by which Tiagabine exerts its antiseizure effect is unknown, it is thought to be related to its ability to increase the activity of gamma aminobutyric acid (GABA), the central nervous system's major inhibitory neurotransmitter. Tiagabine attaches to the GABA uptake carrier's recognition sites. Tiagabine is thought to block GABA uptake into presynaptic neurons as a result of this action, allowing more GABA to be available for receptor binding on the surfaces of post-synaptic cells.

Monitoring Parameters 
Seizure frequency, liver function tests , suicidality

History 
Tiagabine was discovered at Novo Nordisk in Denmark in 1988 by a team of medicinal chemists and pharmacologists under the general direction of Claus Bræstrup.  The drug was co-developed with Abbott Laboratories, in a 40/60 cost sharing deal, with Abbott paying a premium for licensing the IP from the Danish company.

U.S. patents on tiagabine listed in the Orange Book expired in April 2016.

See also
 CI-966
 Deramciclane
 Nipecotic acid
 SKF-89976A

References

External links
 Gabitril(manufacturer's website)

AbbVie brands
Anticonvulsants
Anxiolytics
Carboxylic acids
GABA reuptake inhibitors
Piperidines
Thiophenes